The 1994 African Cup of Nations Final was a football match that took place on 10 April 1994, and was the final match of the 19th edition of the Africa Cup of Nations. It was played in the Stade El Menzah in Tunis, Tunisia. Nigeria won its second championship, beating Zambia in the final 2−1.

The Zambian team was recently constituted, following the 1993 air disaster in which eighteen players and several staff members from the previous team were killed.

Road to the final

Match

Details

External links
Final match details - worldfootball.net  11v11.com
Qualifications details - rsssf

Final
1994
1994
1994
1993–94 in Nigerian football
1993–94 in Zambian football
April 1994 sports events in Africa
20th century in Tunisia